Sydney Falls, more commonly called Kotsuck Creek Falls or Kotsuck Falls, is a waterfall in the Mount Rainier National Park in the U.S. state of Washington.

The name of the falls comes from a 1912 article that mentions that "Sydney Falls is along the Wonderland Trail". The name "Kotsuck" comes from a Chinook Indian word meaning "middle". However, the name "Kotsuck Creek Falls" may be inaccurate, as the names of Kotsuck Creek and Chinook Creek may have been switched at some time in the past.

References

Mount Rainier National Park
Waterfalls of Pierce County, Washington
Waterfalls of Washington (state)